Pardon Elisha Tillinghast (December 10, 1836 – February 9, 1905) was a justice of the Rhode Island Supreme Court from 1891 to 1905, serving as chief justice from 1904 until his death.

Biography
Pardon E. Tillinghast was born in West Greenwich, Rhode Island on December 10, 1836.

He married Ellen F. Paine on November 13, 1867 and they had four children.

Tillinghast served several terms in the Rhode Island General Assembly before he was elected judge of the Supreme Court in 1881. He served in the common pleas division until 1891, then entered the appellate division.

He died at his home in Pawtucket on February 9, 1905.

References

1836 births
1905 deaths
Members of the Rhode Island General Assembly
Justices of the Rhode Island Supreme Court
19th-century American politicians
19th-century American judges